J. L. Mann High School is one of fourteen high schools in the Greenville County School District, South Carolina, United States. It is named after James Lewis Mann (1872–1943), former superintendent of Greenville County Schools. J.L. Mann is also a magnet school for math, science, and technology, allowing students to receive honorary distinction in one of the three areas when they graduate.

Facilities
J. L. Mann High School opened  on July 1, 1965 in the East Parkins Mill Road area of Greenville. On January 5, 2008, students and faculty moved into a new building, which replaced the original high school constructed in 1964. The J. L. Mann football stadium is located next to the old high school, about one mile from the new building.

As of the 2017–2018 school year, the campus comprises two separate facilities: "Building A", the new building completed in 2008; and "Building B", an addition completed in fall of 2017. Building B, intended for tech-integrated project-based learning (including the New Tech program), sports a more modern interior design, and is only accessible to students and visitors via an elevated "sky bridge" connecting it to the second floor of Building A. The addition of Building B was accompanied by a new running track and tennis court.

Principals
As of the 2010–2011 school year, J.L. Mann High School has had 10 principals. 
Larkin Bruce
Ronald Siefred
Milton Diehl
Rudolph Gordon
Bill Stubbs
David Vickery: 1984–1989
Fred Crawford: 1989–2000
Leroy Elrod: 2000–2001
Susan Hughes: 2001–2009
Charles Mayfield: 2009 - 2022
Shannon Gibson: 2022–present

Athletics
J.L. Mann sports programs include cross country, track and field, swimming, softball, baseball, tennis, wrestling, soccer, football, basketball, golf, lacrosse, and volleyball. Their mascot is the Patriot.

Mannuscript
J.L. Mann's student newspaper has won many awards including Best SC Scholastic Newspaper by the South Carolina Scholastic Press Association in 2013. Under adviser Phillip Caston from 2006–13, Mannuscript received the Palmetto Award six times for best in its class from SCSPA as well as six All-State ratings. Mannuscript also received All-Southern ratings in 2012 and 2013 from the Southern Interscholastic Press Association. In 2012, SIPA awarded the Mannuscript staff the Joseph W. Shoquist Freedom of the Press Award for their special issue coverage of a controversy involving Spirit Week funds and an after-school bus program despite unsuccessful attempts of censorship by the J.L. Mann administration.

Notable alumni
 Dextor Clinkscale  former NFL player
 Emilio Pagan  current MLB pitcher

External links
Official website

References 

Public high schools in South Carolina
Schools in Greenville County, South Carolina
1965 establishments in South Carolina